State Route 327 (SR 327) is a north–south state highway in the south central portion of the U.S. state of Ohio. It ends at its northern terminus at SR 180 in Adelphi.

History
SR 327 was commissioned in 1932, routed between Roads and Wellston. In 1935 the highway was extended north to Adelphi. The highway was extended south to US 35 in 1937. In 2002, work began on replacing an at-grade intersection at SR 32 into an interchange south of Wellston. The $9 million project was funded jointly by the Federal Highway Safety Infrastructure program and ODOT's Highway Safety Program (HSP). The project was completed in July 2004 at a cost of $12.5 million, an increase of $3.5 than originally estimated. It also rerouted SR 124 in a brief concurrency.

Major intersections

References

327
Transportation in Jackson County, Ohio
Transportation in Vinton County, Ohio
Transportation in Ross County, Ohio
Transportation in Hocking County, Ohio